Danforth Memorial Library, also known as the Paterson Free Public Library, is located in Paterson, Passaic County, New Jersey, United States. The library was built in 1905 and was added to the National Register of Historic Places on March 1, 1984.

The Library houses the city's art collection, mostly of painting 19th century paintings donated to the city.

History 
The Paterson Free Public Library was established in 1885. It is the oldest public library in New Jersey, and citizens of Paterson created it. Danforth Memorial Library is the current location of the main library branch, and is located at 250 Broadway after the Great Fire of 1902 destroyed the first two libraries. Mary Elizabeth Danforth Ryle funded the historical building in memory of her father, Charles Danforth, a leading industrialist in Paterson. By 1995, there were three (3) additional library branches in the Paterson Public Library system. These branches are the Totowa Branch, Southside Branch, and Northside Branch. Danforth Memorial Library opened the Community Learning Center in 1986, and it has increased its African American and Spanish language collection. Thanks to the Philippine ambassador to the United States, a Filipino collection has been established in this branch. In 2002, the Bill & Melinda Gates Foundation donated 35 computers. The Danforth Memorial Library is a member of the PALS Plus consortium.

Architecture 
The Danforth Memorial Library architecture is described as Classical Revival. It is a two-story building with four monumental columns made with gray limestone material on a granite foundation. It was designed by Henry Bacon, who also designed the Lincoln Memorial in Washington, D.C. The property owner is the Board of Library Trustees of the City of Paterson. In 2020, the Governor of New Jersey, Phil Murphy, granted $734,812 to rehabilitate the historic landmark; this fund came from the Library Construction Bond Act. According to the library administration, the rehabilitation project will cost $1,469,624; the current mayor, André Sayegh, and his administration need to cover the matching amount. The rehabilitation project consists of renovating the Children's Department and the Community Literacy Center, modifying the elevator to American with Disabilities standards, replacing the library's roof, and repairing the retaining wall.

Administration 
As of March 2022, the Paterson Free Public Library director is Corey Fleming.

Board of Library Trustees of the City of Paterson. 
As of March 2022:

 Herman Irving, Alt to Superintendent
 Debra Bracy, Mayor’s Alternate
 Errol Kerr
 Tracy Pearson
 Irene Sterling, Secretary/Treasurer
 Derya Taskin, Vice-President
 Charisse Taylor
 Dennis Vroegindewey
 André Sayegh, Mayor
 Eileen Shafer, School Superintendent

See also
Mary Danforth Ryle
National Register of Historic Places listings in Passaic County, New Jersey

References

Library buildings completed in 1905
Libraries on the National Register of Historic Places in New Jersey
Neoclassical architecture in New Jersey
Buildings and structures in Paterson, New Jersey
Public libraries in New Jersey
National Register of Historic Places in Passaic County, New Jersey
New Jersey Register of Historic Places
1905 establishments in New Jersey